Proxy (A protest, a reflection, a couple of regrets and a rant) is the tenth studio album released by progressive rock group The Tangent. The special edition of the album contains a bonus track —  an except from Exo-Oceans, an album by Andy Tillison's project Kalman Filter.

Track listing

Personnel 
Andy Tillison – keyboards, vocals, electronic drums (4), and bass synth (4)
Jonas Reingold – bass guitar and Taurus Pedals
Steve Roberts – drums, percussion, and assorted gongs
Theo Travis – saxophones and flutes
Luke Machin – guitars
Göran Edman - backing vocals

References 

The Tangent albums
2018 albums
Inside Out Music albums